Lee Kwan or Li Kun (18 February 1930 – 12 March 2008) was a Chinese actor.

He joined Shaw Brothers in 1957 and acted in Mandarin films. He later played supporting roles in Bruce Lee's The Big Boss and Fist of Fury. Later he became a film and television actor in Taiwan. He won the 2001 Golden Bell Award for Best Supporting Actor in a Miniseries or Television Film for his role in Forbidden Love.

Lee Kwan died of a stroke on March 12, 2008 in Taipei at the age of 78.

Filmography

Film

External links

1930 births
2008 deaths
Chinese male film actors
Taiwanese male film actors
Taiwanese male television actors
Film directors from Tianjin
Male actors from Tianjin
20th-century Chinese male actors
Chinese male television actors
Chinese film directors
Taiwanese people from Tianjin